Jamie Pitman (born 6 January 1976) is an English footballer turned football manager, who was the manager of Hereford United until 5 March 2012.

Playing career
He progressed through the youth system at Swindon Town, eventually making three league appearances before being released. He joined Hereford United in early 1996 when the Bulls started their push for the playoffs. He missed much of the following season through injury, which saw Hereford relegated out of the Football League. He stayed with the club for their first season in the Conference before spending two seasons each at Yeovil Town and Woking. During his spell at the latter, he scored the goal that knocked Hereford out of the FA Cup in 2000.

He rejoined the Bulls for the 2002–03 season when they were undergoing a squad clearout. He scored twice on his return, in a 2–1 win against Farnborough Town and in the next two seasons he missed only a handful of League matches. His final game for the club was the Conference Playoff Final in 2006, where he came on as a substitute for the start of extra time to help Hereford regain their League status. He was the only Hereford player on the pitch who had experienced the club's relegation in 1997 as well as the two playoff disappointments in 2004 and 2005. Although he wished to stay at the club, he was not offered a new contract.

At the start of the 2006–07 season, he signed for Forest Green Rovers. He made a total of 64 appearances in the Conference National scoring just once and was player/assistant manager to Jim Harvey before he departed in August 2008 for Hereford United as their club physiotherapist.

Management career
On 4 October 2010, Pitman was appointed caretaker manager of The Bulls after Simon Davey and his assistant Andy Fensome were sacked, and on 16 December 2010 he was appointed manager until the end of the season. On 21 April 2011 it was confirmed by the club that Pitman had been handed a new two-year contract as manager of Hereford Utd. On 5 March 2012 he was sacked by Hereford after they had won only once in their last eight games but was retained on the club's coaching staff.

Managerial statistics
As of 5 March 2012.

Honours
Individual
Football Conference Goalscorer of the Month: August 2002

References

External links

1976 births
Living people
People from Trowbridge
English footballers
English football managers
Swindon Town F.C. players
Hereford United F.C. players
Yeovil Town F.C. players
Woking F.C. players
Forest Green Rovers F.C. players
National League (English football) players
English Football League players
Hereford United F.C. managers
Association football physiotherapists
Alumni of the University of Salford
English Football League managers
Association football midfielders